Rodrigo Leandro da Costa (born 17 September 1985), known as Rodrigo, is a Brazilian footballer.

In January 2013, Rodrigo joined Korean K League Classic side Busan IPark. He made his debut for IPark on 10 March 2013 against Gyeongnam FC and his first goal for the club came from the penalty spot against Daejeon Citizen on 28 April.

Club career statistics
As of 10 November 2013

References

External links
 
 

1985 births
Expatriate footballers in Malta
Maltese Premier League players
Naxxar Lions F.C. players
Living people
Brazilian footballers
K League 1 players
Busan IPark players
Brazilian expatriate footballers
Expatriate footballers in Kuwait
Brazilian expatriate sportspeople in Kuwait
Expatriate footballers in South Korea
Brazilian expatriate sportspeople in South Korea
Expatriate footballers in Qatar
Brazilian expatriate sportspeople in Qatar
Muaither SC players
Qatar Stars League players
Association football forwards
Al-Shabab SC (Kuwait) players
Brazilian expatriate sportspeople in Oman
Expatriate footballers in Oman
Kuwait Premier League players